The 1887 Tufts Jumbos football team represented Tufts University in the 1887 college football season. The Jumbos finished the season with a record of 4–6.

Schedule

References

Tufts
Tufts Jumbos football seasons
Tufts Jumbos football